NGC 7015 is a spiral galaxy located about 203 million light-years away from Earth in the constellation Equuleus. NGC 7015 was discovered by French astronomer Édouard Stephan on September 29, 1878. It is also part of a group of galaxies called [CHM2007] LDC 1450.

See also  
 NGC 1300
 Barred spiral galaxy
 NGC 7003
 List of NGC objects (7001–7840)

References

External links
 

Spiral galaxies
Equuleus
7015
11674
66076
Astronomical objects discovered in 1878